Sir (Reginald) Patrick Linstead CBE, DSc, HonDSc, DIC, HonFCGI, HonMIMM, FRS (28 August 1902, in London – 22 September 1966, in London) was an English chemist.

Biography
Patrick Linstead was born on 28 August 1902 in Southgate, London, the second son of Edward Flatman Linstead, advertising manager for Burroughs Wellcome, and Florence Evelyn, née Hester. After primary education in Southgate, Linstead attended the City of London School from the age of 11 to 17, where the science master, George H J Adlam, was a considerable influence. He joined Imperial College in 1920 and graduated three years later with first class honours, before continuing to a PhD in Sir Jocelyn Thorpe’s group.

In 1929 Linstead was appointed as a demonstrator at Imperial, and later lecturer. In the following ten years he was awarded a DSc and three medals, and also married Aileen E E R Abbott. In 1938 he was appointed Professor Chemistry at the University of Sheffield, but the following year his wife died at the age of 37, giving birth to their first child, Hilary. She married Leon Max Stemler of Newcastle, New South Wales at Holy Trinity Church, South Kensington in 1962, and moved to Australia with her husband.

In their obituary of Linstead, Barton, Rydon and Elvidge wrote that “Linstead’s professional life divides itself conveniently into found periods”, which they go on to describe in detail:

The First Period at Imperial College, 1920-1938The Years in Between, 1938-1949The Second Period at Imperial College, 1949-1954The Years as Rector, 1955-1966

Linstead Hall at Imperial College is named in his honour.
He was made a Fellow of the Royal Society in 1940. He was also a Commander of the Order of the British Empire (CBE) and was knighted in 1959.

Patrick Linstead can be heard in a speech at the Mansion House dinner celebrating the 50th anniversary of the College in 1957.

His second marriage was in Aberdare on 11 July 1942, to Marjorie Walters, a DPhil from Somerville College, Oxford. They had no children. Lady Linstead died at their Blockley home in Gloucestershire on 2 November 1987. They also had one at 170 Queens Gate, SW7, a short walk from Imperial College.

Sir Patrick Linstead died on 22 September 1966 at St George’s Hospital, which was then on the site of the present Lanesborough Hotel at Hyde Park Corner. A memorial service was held on 25 October at Holy Trinity Brompton.

References

External links 
 Sir Patrick Linstead — video and podcast archive

1902 births
1966 deaths
People educated at the City of London School
Alumni of Imperial College London
English chemists
Academics of the University of Sheffield
Harvard University faculty
Rectors of Imperial College London
Fellows of the Royal Society
Commanders of the Order of the British Empire
Knights Bachelor